Aydogdy Kurbanov (in Turkmen: Aýdogdy Gurbanow, born 2 February 1976, in Ashgabat, Turkmen Soviet Socialist Republic, USSR) is a Turkmen archaeologist and historian whose main area of research is prehistoric and late antiquity of Central Asia.

Born in Ashgabat, Turkmenistan, he graduated from the Turkmen State University named after Magtymguly and he did a Ph.D. at the Free University of Berlin and has been a postdoctoral researcher in archaeology and history at the Academy of Sciences of Turkmenistan. He has been the head of department of archaeology of the Academy's Institute of Archaeology and Ethnography.

Education
Kurbanov completed a Ph.D. from the Free University of Berlin, Germany. He has been a 'Gerda Henkel visiting research fellow' at the German Archaeological Institute.

He speaks multiple languages including English, Russian, Turkish, Turkmen, and German.

Career and research
Kurbanov has been a postdoctoral researcher in the field of history and archaeology at the Institute of Archaeology and Ethnography of the Academy of Sciences of Turkmenistan, with "The Eastern frontiers of the Sasanian Empire: Case Study in Southern Turkmenistan" as his research project. He has served as the head of the institute's Department of Archaeology. He has also worked at the Eurasian department of the German Archaeological Institute in Berlin. From January to April 2007, he worked at the University of Pennsylvania's Department of East Asian Languages and Civilizations on the research project "State Building by the Hephthalites (White Huns) in the Fourth Through Sixth Centuries" under the Fulbright Scholar Program.

With financial grants from National Geographic, he executed two research projects in Turkmenistan, namely "Defining the Eastern Frontiers of the Sasanian Empire. Survey in the Ancient Abiverd and Merv Regions. (from 1 July 2014 to 30 June 2015)" and "Exploring the Neolithic to Chalcolithic Transition in Central Asia. Excavations in Dashly-depe. (from 1 March 2018 to 28 February 2019)".

He has also excavated in Turkmenistan. He is a research fellow at the Institute of Ancient Near Eastern Archaeology of the Free University of Berlin.

Works

Books
Some of the books authored and coauthored by Kurbanov are as follows:

Research papers
Some of the research papers authored by Kurbanov are as follows:

References

External links

1976 births
Free University of Berlin alumni
German Archaeological Institute
21st-century archaeologists
21st-century historians
Living people